Magnolia calimaensis is a species of flowering plant in the family Magnoliaceae. It is endemic to Colombia, where it is known from a single location. It is a tree which makes up part of the canopy in tropical forest habitat. Its common name is almagnegra del Calima.

References

calimaensis
Endemic flora of Colombia
Taxonomy articles created by Polbot